Bwisi (also spelled Ibwisi, Mbwisi) is a language spoken mainly in the Kibangou District (Niari Region) of the Republic of Congo, next to the Gabon border, where it is also spoken by a minority. According to the Ethnologue, approximately 4,250 people speak the language today worldwide.

References

External links
 Bwisi at WolframAlpha

Languages of the Republic of the Congo
Languages of Gabon
Sira languages